Metallaxis is a genus of moths in the family Geometridae first described by Louis Beethoven Prout in 1932.

Species
 Metallaxis amandae Holloway, 1997
 Metallaxis herbuloti Viette, 1978
 Metallaxis miniata Yazaki & M. Wang, 2004
 Metallaxis semipurpurascens Hampson, 1896
 Metallaxis semiustus Swinhoe, 1894
 Metallaxis sogai Viette, 1979
 Metallaxis teledapa L. B. Prout, 1932

References
Prout, L. B. (1932). "New genera and species of Sterrhinae (Fam. Geometridae)". Novitates Zoologicae. 37: 229–251 - on page 229.

Rhodostrophiini